Cuphea oreophila also known as the sacred flower of the Andes is a Lythraceae perennial plant that grows into a small bush.

Description

It has unusually large leaflike appendages.

References

oreophila